Necedah  is a village in Juneau County, Wisconsin, United States. The population was 916 at the 2010 census. The village is located within the Town of Necedah.

Geography
Necedah is located at  (44.0262, −90.0737).

Airport
Necedah Airport (KDAF), serves the city and surrounding communities.

Demographics

2010 census
As of the census of 2010, there were 916 people, 376 households, and 223 families living in the village. The racial makeup of the village was 96.6% White, 0.7% African American, 0.1% Native American, 0.3% Asian, 0.8% from other races, and 1.5% from two or more races. Hispanic or Latino of any race were 2.8% of the population.

There were 376 households, of which 34.3% had children under the age of 18 living with them, 41.8% were married couples living together, 11.2% had a female householder with no husband present, 6.4% had a male householder with no wife present, and 40.7% were non-families. 34.0% of all households were made up of individuals, and 18.9% had someone living alone who was 65 years of age or older. The average household size was 2.41 and the average family size was 3.11.

The median age in the village was 38.8 years. 27.7% of residents were under the age of 18; 7.4% were between the ages of 18 and 24; 23.2% were from 25 to 44; 25.5% were from 45 to 64; and 16% were 65 years of age or older. The gender makeup of the village was 48.0% male and 52.0% female.

2000 census
As of the census of 2000, there were 888 people, 359 households, and 236 families living in the village. The population density was 333.3 people per square mile (128.9/km2). There were 414 housing units at an average density of 155.4 per square mile (60.1/km2). The racial makeup of the village was 98.20% White, 0.23% Black or African American, 0.34% Native American, 0.23% Asian, 0.45% from other races, and 0.56% from two or more races. 0.68% of the population were Hispanic or Latino of any race.

There were 359 households, out of which 37.0% had children under the age of 18 living with them, 48.7% were married couples living together, 11.7% had a female householder with no husband present, and 34.0% were non-families. 29.8% of all households were made up of individuals, and 13.1% had someone living alone who was 65 years of age or older. The average household size was 2.43 and the average family size was 3.05.

In the village, the population was spread out, with 30.5% under the age of 18, 8.0% from 18 to 24, 28.9% from 25 to 44, 20.5% from 45 to 64, and 12.0% who were 65 years of age or older. The median age was 34 years. For every 100 females, there were 93.5 males. For every 100 females age 18 and over, there were 91.0 males.

The median income for a household in the village was $32,135, and the median income for a family was $37,788. Males had a median income of $34,417 versus $20,673 for females. The per capita income for the village was $14,766. About 9.8% of families and 13.1% of the population were below the poverty line, including 10.1% of those under age 18 and 15.6% of those age 65 or over.

Attractions
The Necedah Shrine, Necedah National Wildlife Refuge, and the Petenwell Rock are located nearby.

Notable people

 Joseph W. Babcock, U.S. Representative.
 Harold G. Bradbury, U.S. Coast Guard admiral
 John T. Kingston, Wisconsin State Senator and Representative.
 John Kingston, Jr., Wisconsin State Senator
 Eliphalet S. Miner, Wisconsin State Representative and Senator
 Frank M. Reed, Wisconsin State Representative
 E. D. Rogers, Wisconsin State Representative
 Jim Sauter, Jay Sauter, Johnny Sauter, Tim Sauter, and Travis Sauter, NASCAR drivers
 W. Peter Wheelihan, Wisconsin State Representative

Images

References

External links

 Village of Necedah, Wisconsin
 Necedah National Wildlife Refuge
 Sanborn fire insurance maps: 1885 1891 1898 1909 1916

Villages in Juneau County, Wisconsin
Villages in Wisconsin